Swarna Ram is an Indian Politician from the state of Punjab. He was a minister from 2007 to 2012 for Technical Education, Industrial Training and Social Security in the Punjab government  and the deputy speaker of the Punjab Legislative Assembly from 18 June 1997 to 26 July 1997.

Constituency
Ram represented the  Phagwara assembly constituency from  1997 to 2002 and 2007 to 2012.

Political Party  
Ram is a member of Bharatiya Janata Party.

References 

Members of the Punjab Legislative Assembly
Living people
People from Kapurthala district
Bharatiya Janata Party politicians from Punjab
Year of birth missing (living people)